Gauvin Alexander Bailey is an American-Canadian author and art historian. He is Professor and Alfred and Isabel Bader Chair in Southern Baroque Art at Queen's University.

Bailey is a correspondent étranger at the Académie des Inscriptions et Belles-Lettres, Institut de France and a Fellow of the Royal Society of Canada. He held the 2017 Panofsky Professorship at the Zentralinstitut für Kunstgeschichte in Munich.

Early life and education
Bailey was born in Vancouver B.C. on 8 July 1966. He attended the Schillergymnasium Münster among other schools, and graduated from Trinity College, Toronto at the University of Toronto with a B.A. in 1989 and M.A. in 1990, and from Harvard University with a Ph.D. in 1996.

Career
Bailey has taught Renaissance, Baroque, Latin American, and Asian art at King’s College at the University of Aberdeen, Boston College and Clark University, where he was program director for Art History and twice won the Hodgkins Junior Faculty Teaching Award (1999, 2002), and he has held guest professorships at the Zentralinstitut für Kunstgeschichte in Munich (as the 2017 Panofsky Professor), Boston University and Georgetown University.

Research and publications
He has published nine books including, most recently, The Palace of Sans-Souci in Milot, Haiti (ca. 1806–13): the Untold Story of the Potsdam of the Rainforest (Deutscher Kunstverlag, 2017) and Architecture & Urbanism in the French Atlantic Empire: State, Church and Identity, 1604–1830 (McGill-Queen’s University Press, 2018). A tenth book entitled The Architecture of Empire: France in the Indian Ocean and Southeast Asia, 1664–1962 will be published by Mcgill-Queen's University Press in 2022.  He has also co-authored or co-edited seven other books and over 80 articles and book chapters on topics ranging from Renaissance ivories carved in the Philippines to Baroque paintings in Italy in a time of Plague (disease), especially Anthony van Dyck and the cult of Saint Rosalia. Bailey maintains an active international lecture schedule and has made over 100 presentations at academic institutions and museums on six continents, including Harvard University, Yale University, the New York University Institute of Fine Arts, the Center for Advanced Studies in the Visual Arts at the National Gallery of Art, the Getty Research Institute, the University of Cambridge, the Courtauld Institute of Art (London), the University of London, the University of St. Andrews, the University of Edinburgh, the Institut de France, Sorbonne University, Sapienza University of Rome, the Bibliotheca Hertziana, Rome, University of Heidelberg, University of Innsbruck and the Metropolitan Museum of Art, among many others, particularly in South America. His work has been translated into French, German, Italian, Spanish, Portuguese, Chinese, and Japanese. He regularly contributes exhibition and book reviews to The Burlington Magazine and The Art Newspaper.

Major Awards
2018 National Endowment for the Humanities Research Fellowship 
2018 Social Sciences and Humanities Research Council of Canada Insight Grant.
2014 National Endowment for the Humanities Research Fellowship. NEH grant products: Art and Architecture in the French Atlantic World, 1608–1828
2014 Social Sciences and Humanities Research Council of Canada Insight Development Grant.Diverse projects earn funding
2010 Guggenheim Fellowship.
2010 American Philosophical Society Franklin Research Grant Franklin Research Grants
2010 Arts and Humanities Research Council Fellowship. 
2010 Carnegie Trust for the Universities of Scotland Grant. Latin travels unearth ‘architectural treasures’ for Aberdeen academic | News | The University of Aberdeen
2009 British Academy Research Grant Small Research Grants: 2008–09 Round
2007 Renaissance Society of America Robert Lehman Foundation Research Grant RSA Fellowship Winners – Renaissance Society of America
2006 American Philosophical Society Franklin Research Grant Franklin Research Grants
2005 American Philosophical Society Franklin Research Grant Franklin Research Grants
2005 National Endowment for the Humanities Research Fellowship NEH grants
2003 Renaissance Society of America Robert Lehman Foundation Research Grant RSA Fellowship Winners – Renaissance Society of America
2000 Villa I Tatti Hanna Kiel Fellowship
2000 American Academy in Rome Rome Prize 
2000 Renaissance Society of America Robert Lehman Foundation Research Grant RSA Fellowship Winners – Renaissance Society of America

Books
Architecture and Urbanism in the French Atlantic Empire: State, Church, and Society, 1604–1830, Montreal: McGill-Queen's University Press, 2018, Architecture and Urbanism in the French Atlantic Empire | McGill-Queen’s University Press Reviewed in Transactions of the Society of Architectural Historians Review: Architecture and Urbanism in the French Atlantic Empire: State, Church, and Society, 1604–1830, by Gauvin Alexander Bailey,Canadian Architect, Journal of the Royal Architectural Institute of CanadaBook Review: Architecture and Urbanism in the French Atlantic Empire; Transactions of the Ancient Monuments SocietyTransactions – Ancient Monuments Society and the Journal of Modern History Architecture and Urbanism in the French Atlantic Empire: State, Church, and Society, 1604–1830. By Gauvin Alexander Bailey. McGill-Queen’s French Atlantic Worlds Series, volume 1. Edited by Nicholas Dew and Jean-Pierre Le Glaunec.Montreal: McGill-Queen’s University Press, 2018. Pp. xviii+620. $67.50.
Der Palast von Sans-Souci in Milot, Haiti (ca. 1806–1813): Das vergessene Potsdam im Regenwald/The Palace of Sans-Souci in Milot, Haiti (ca. 1806–13): The Untold Story of the Potsdam of the Rainforest. Berlin and Munich: Zentralinstitut für Kunstgeschichte and Deutscher Kunstverlag, 2017. Deutscher Kunstverlag – Vorschau Reviewed in The Art Newspaper. Book review | Henry I of Haiti: the little-known story of a king and his amazing building spree
The Spiritual Rococo: Décor and Divinity from the Salons of Paris to the Missions of Patagonia. Farnham, Surrey: Ashgate, 2014.The Spiritual Rococo: Decor and Divinity from the Salons of Paris to the Missions of Patagonia
Baroque & Rococo. London: Phaidon Press, 2012.Baroque & Rococo | Art | Phaidon Store  Reviewed in The SpectatorA selection of recent art books | The Spectator
The Andean Hybrid Baroque: Convergent Cultures in the Churches of Colonial Peru, University of Notre Dame Press, 2010, The Andean Hybrid Baroque // Books // University of Notre Dame Press Spanish edition El barroco andino híbrido: culturas convergentes en las iglesias del Sur Andino published by Ediciones El Lector, Arequipa, 2018. El Barroco Andino Híbrido. Culturas convergentes en las iglesias coloniales del Sur Andino – LIBROS PERUANOS
Art of colonial Latin America, Phaidon, 2005,   Reviewed in The Times and The Observer (a Book of the Year for 2005).Books of the year
Between Renaissance and Baroque: Jesuit Art in Rome, 1565–1610. Toronto: University of Toronto Press, 2003.  
Art on the Jesuit missions in Asia and Latin America, 1542–1773, University of Toronto Press, 2001  Winner of the 2001 Roland H. Bainton Book Prize for Art and Music.
The Jesuits and the Grand Mogul: Renaissance Art at the Imperial Court of India, 1580–1630. Washington: Smithsonian Institution, 1998.

References

American art historians
Academic staff of Queen's University at Kingston
University of Toronto alumni
Harvard University alumni
Living people
Year of birth missing (living people)
Fellows of the Royal Society of Canada